Ronald Jones (born September 17, 1981) is a former gridiron football offensive lineman and defensive lineman. He was signed as an undrafted free agent by the San Francisco 49ers in 2004. He played college football at Southern Miss.

Jones was also a member of the Indianapolis Colts, Nashville Kats, San Jose SaberCats and Toronto Argonauts.

References

External links
Toronto Argonauts bio

1981 births
Living people
American players of Canadian football
American football defensive linemen
Canadian football defensive linemen
Southern Miss Golden Eagles football players
Sportspeople from Gulfport, Mississippi
San Francisco 49ers players
Indianapolis Colts players
Nashville Kats players
Players of American football from Mississippi
San Jose SaberCats players
Toronto Argonauts players
Arizona Rattlers players